Orphan-Nor is a Norwegian pharmaceutical company specializing in the production and marketing of orphan drugs. These medicines are used to treat rare diseases.

Founded in Trondheim in 2007 the company has been chartered by the Norwegian Ministry of Health and Care Services to improve global access to orphan medicines. Funding has come from the Norwegian national oil fund.

References

Pharmaceutical companies of Norway